Beit ar-Rush al-Fauqa is a Palestinian village located eighteen kilometers southwest of Hebron.The village is in the Hebron Governorate Southern West Bank. According to the Palestinian Central Bureau of Statistics, the village had a population of 979 in 2007.

History
Al-Dimashqi (d.1327) noted one area called Bait-ras in Palestine, and A. F. Mehren thought its description matched the location of the Beit er-Rush of Robinson.

Ottoman era
In 1838, a Beit er-Rush was noted by Edward Robinson as a place "in ruins or deserted," part of the area between the mountains and Gaza, but subject to the government of el-Khulil.

In 1863, Victor Guérin noted about the ruins here: ”These ruins consist of a large number of heaps of irregular materials. Each of these heaps surrounds a cave hollowed in the rock, into which there is a descent of steps, or by an incline. These subterranean dwellings formed the basement of one-storied houses which stood above them. These have been pulled down and put up again several times, while the cellars are just the same as when they were cut in the rock."

In 1883, the PEF's Survey of Western Palestine noted here: ”Traces of ruins on a mound.”

British Mandate era
At the time of the 1931 census of Palestine the population of the village, called Kh. Beit er Rush al Ulya, was counted under Dura.

Jordanian era
In the wake of the 1948 Arab–Israeli War, and after the 1949 Armistice Agreements, Beit ar-Rush al-Fauqa came under Jordanian rule. It was annexed by Jordan in 1950.

The Jordanian census of 1961 found 162 inhabitants in Beit ar-Rush al-Fauqa.

Post 1967
Since the Six-Day War in 1967, Beit ar-Rush al-Fauqa has been under Israeli occupation.

References

Bibliography

External links
 Welcome To Bayt al-Rush al-Fuqa
Survey of Western Palestine, Map 20:   IAA, Wikimedia commons
 Beit ar Rush al Foqa Village (Fact Sheet), Applied Research Institute–Jerusalem, ARIJ
 Beit ar Rush al Foqa Village Profile, ARIJ
  Beit ar Rush al Foqa Village Area Photo, ARIJ
The priorities and needs for development in Beit ar Rush al Fouqa village based on the community and local authorities’ assessment, ARIJ

Villages in the West Bank
Hebron Governorate
Municipalities of the State of Palestine